Steve Lussier (born 1973) is a Canadian politician, who was mayor of Sherbrooke, Quebec from 2017 until 2021. He was elected in the 2017 municipal election defeating incumbent mayor Bernard Sévigny.

Prior to his election as mayor, Lussier was a mortgage development advisor and a real estate developer.

References

1973 births
Living people
Businesspeople from Sherbrooke
Mayors of Sherbrooke
French Quebecers
People from Saint-Jean-sur-Richelieu
21st-century Canadian politicians